Protoproutia laredoata is a species of geometrid moth in the family Geometridae. It is found in North America.

The MONA or Hodges number for Protoproutia laredoata is 7093.

References

Further reading

 
 

Sterrhini
Articles created by Qbugbot
Moths described in 1931